Michael Edward "Mike" Szymanczyk (born 3 January 1949) is a former Chairman and CEO of Altria Group, serving in that position from 2008 to 2012. He previously served as Chairman and CEO of Philip Morris Companies Inc. between April 2002 and August 2002.

Biography 
He received a Bachelor of Science degree in Finance from the Kelley School of Business of Indiana University in 1971. Szmanczyk played varsity basketball for Indiana University

He started his career at Procter & Gamble, working his way through their brand management path.

Prior to his appointment as chairman, he served as President and CEO of Philip Morris USA between November 1997 and April 2002. He was Chief Operating Officer of Philip Morris USA from July 1997 to November 1997. Michael first joined Philip Morris USA as Senior Vice President, Sales, in October 1990.

Philanthropy 
He currently serves on the board of trustees for the Virginia Foundation for Independent Colleges, the University of Richmond, and the Virginia Commonwealth University School of Engineering Foundation. Szmanczyk is also Chairman of the Dean's Advisory Council for the school's Kelley School of Business.

References 

1949 births
Living people
Indiana Hoosiers men's basketball players
American chief executives
American tobacco industry executives
University of Richmond people
Virginia Commonwealth University people
Philip Morris USA
20th-century American businesspeople
American men's basketball players